Itamar Moses (born 1977) is an American playwright, author, and television writer.

Biography
Moses grew up in a Jewish family in Berkeley, California, earned his bachelor's degree at Yale University, and his Master of Fine Arts degree in dramatic writing from New York University. He has taught playwriting at both Yale and New York University, and he has written for Men of a Certain Age and Boardwalk Empire.

His most prominent work, the musical The Band's Visit, opened on December 8, 2016 at the Atlantic Theater Company. That production won the 2017 Obie Award for Musical Theatre Off-Broadway. After closing on January 9, 2017, the musical moved to Broadway. It began previews on October 7, 2017 and officially opened on November 9, 2017 at the Ethel Barrymore Theatre. For his work on The Band's Visit, Moses won the 2018 Tony Award for Best Book of a Musical.

Works
Dorothy and Alice (short), world premiere at the Manhattan Theatre Source, January 2001
Bach at Leipzig, world premiere at the Hangar Theatre in Ithaca, New York, July 2002.
Outrage, world premiere at Portland Center Stage, 2003. Workshop at Just Add Water: A Playwright's Festival in 2001.
Authorial Intent and Idea, (shorts), world premiere as a double-bill at Manhattan Theatre Source, New York, April 2005
Celebrity Row, world premiere at Portland Center Stage, March 2006
The Four of Us, world premiere at the San Diego Old Globe Theatre, February 3, 2007
Szinhaz, (short), world premiere at the Duke Theater, New York City, April 2007
Yellowjackets, world premiere at Berkeley Repertory Theatre, September 2008
Back Back Back, world premiere at the San Diego Old Globe Theatre, September 2008
 Love/Stories (Or, But You Will Get Used to It), (short), world premiere at the Flea Theater, New York City, February 2009
Completeness, world premiere at South Coast Repertory Theatre, April 17, 2011
Nobody Loves You (book), co-written with Gaby Alter; at San Diego Old Globe Theatre, May 24, 2012; at Second Stage Theatre, July 18, 2013
The Fortress of Solitude (book), world premiere at Public Theater, New York City, September 2014
The Band's Visit (book), with music and lyrics by David Yazbek

Bibliography
Bach at Leipzig. New York: Faber and Faber, 2005.
The Four of Us. New York: Faber and Faber, 2008.

References

External links
Internet Off-Broadway Database
 Outrage at Google Books
 Review of Outrage at curtainup.com
 Review of Bach at Leipzig at curtainup.com

1977 births
Living people
21st-century American dramatists and playwrights
Jewish American dramatists and playwrights
Tony Award winners
Writers from Berkeley, California
Yale University alumni
New York University alumni
Yale University faculty
New York University faculty
21st-century American Jews